This is a list of the Australian moth species of the Heliocosma group. It also acts as an index to the species articles and forms part of the full List of moths of Australia.

Acmosara polyxena Meyrick, 1886
Choristis discotypa (Turner, 1916)
Heliocosma anthodes Meyrick, 1910
Heliocosma argyroleuca Lower, 1916
Heliocosma exoeca Meyrick, 1910
Heliocosma incongruana (Walker, 1863)
Heliocosma melanotypa Turner, 1925
Heliocosma rhodopnoana Meyrick, 1881
Hyperxena scierana Meyrick, 1882

External links 
Heliocosma group at Australian Insects

Australia